UC Riverside Highlanders football represented the University of California, Riverside from the 1955 through the 1975 college football seasons. The Highlanders originally competed as an Independent before they joined the California Collegiate Athletic Association (CCAA) in 1969. They played their home game at Highlander Stadium in Riverside, California. During their 21 years of competition, the Highlanders compiled an all-time record of 84 wins, 83 losses and 8 ties (84–83–8).

History
In 1954, former California All-America Rod Franz was hired to serve as the first head coach of the Riverside program. After only one season, Franz resigned, and Carl Selin was hired as head coach. Selin remained in his position through the 1958 season when he resigned to become an assistant coach at the Coast Guard Academy.

After Gil Allan served as head coach for only the 1964 season, in March 1965, former Highlanders quarterback Pete Kettela was named head coach. Kettela resigned in 1970 after he compiled an overall record of 23 wins, 19 losses and 2 ties (23–19–2) during his five-year tenure. He resigned his position as he felt the school was not expending appropriate resources on the football program.

After serving as an assistant coach for five seasons, in February 1970 Gary Knecht was promoted to head coach. He compiled an overall record of six wins, thirteen losses and one tie (6–13–1) from 1970 through the 1971 season. Knecht resigned as head coach in March 1972, just as coach Kettela had done previously, as the university had not placed enough resources into the football program. Wayne Howard was hired in 1972, and prior to his resignation in December 1973 to become the head coach at Long Beach State, led the Highlanders to a record of seventeen wins and three losses (17–3). Under Howard, the 1972 squad finished the season with a record of nine wins and one loss (9–1) to capture a share of the first conference championship for the Highlanders.

On December 21, 1973, Bob Toledo was hired as the Highlanders' head coach. As head coach, Toledo led the Highlanders to an overall record of fifteen wins and six losses (15–6) and consecutive conference championships in 1974 and 1975. However, on December 4, 1975, the football program was discontinued by the university with a general lack of attendance and poor gate receipts cited for its being discontinued. Toledo and his staff remained under contract until July 1, 1976.

Head coaches

All-time seasons
During their 21 years of competition, the Highlanders compiled an all-time record of 84 wins, 83 losses and 8 ties (84–83–8).

Highlanders in the NFL
UC Riverside has seven alumni that have played in the National Football League (NFL).

Notes

References

 
1955 establishments in California
1975 disestablishments in California
American football teams established in 1955
American football teams disestablished in 1975